Six ships of the French Navy have been named Magnifique:

Ships named Magnifique 
 , a 64-gun ship of the line, bore the name during her career  
 , a galley 
 , a 70-gun ship of the line 
 , a 80-gun ship of the line 
 , a 74-gun ship of the line, lead ship of her class 
 , a 80-gun Bucentaure-class ship of the line

Notes and references
Notes

References

Bibliography
 

French Navy ship names